Stourton may refer to:

Places
Stourton, Staffordshire
Stourton, Warwickshire
Stourton, West Yorkshire, area of Leeds
Stourton, Wiltshire
Stourton Caundle, Dorset
Stourton Park, home of Stourbridge R.F.C.
Stourton, fictional country house of Charles Rainier in Random Harvest by James Hilton

People
Baron Stourton
Edward Stourton (b. 1957), BBC presenter
Ivo Stourton, author